Sumit Shome (born 23 December 1955) is an Indian former cricketer. He played first-class cricket for Bengal for Jharkhand.

See also
 List of Bengal cricketers

References

External links
 

1955 births
Living people
Indian cricketers
Bengal cricketers
Jharkhand cricketers
People from Jamshedpur
Cricketers from Jharkhand